Wang Chang-uk is a politician of the Democratic People's Republic of Korea (North Korea). He is also Minister of Nuclear Power Industry and member of the Political Bureau of the Central Committee of the Workers' Party of Korea.

Biography
In April 2013, he was appointed as the Nuclear Industry Minister in the Cabinet of North Korea. In May 2016, the during the 7th Congress of the Workers' Party of Korea he was elected as a candidate member of the Central Committee of the Workers' Party of Korea.

References

Government ministers of North Korea
Living people
Alternate members of the 8th Central Committee of the Workers' Party of Korea
1960 births